Surajit Dhara is an Indian physicist affiliated to the School of Physics in University of Hyderabad, Telangana, in various capacities since 2006. His area of special interest is soft matter physics. He studies control and manipulation of topological defects of liquid crystals, elasticity and defect mediated directed assembly, topological active matter, rheology and photonics of liquid crystals. He is a recipient of the Shanti Swarup Bhatnagar Prize for Science and Technology for his contributions to physical sciences in 2020.

Surajit Dhara obtained his B.Sc. degree from Ramananda College (Bishnupur) in 1995, M.Sc. degree from University of Burdwan in 1998 and Ph.D. degree from Raman Research Institute, Bangalore, in 2004. He was a postdoctoral fellow in Tokyo Institute of Technology, Japan, in 2008, a visiting scientist at Jozef Stefan Institute, University of Ljubljana, Slovenia, during 2013–2018 and a visiting professor at Ulsan National Institute of Science and Technology, South Korea, in 2018.

Publications

External links

References

Living people
Indian physicists
21st-century Indian physicists
Recipients of the Shanti Swarup Bhatnagar Award in Physical Science
Scientists from West Bengal
1975 births